Bad Luck Love is a 2000 Finnish crime drama film directed by Olli Saarela.

In 2001, the film won a total of four Jussi Awards: Best Direction, Best Male Supporting Actor (Tommi Eronen), Best Female Supporting Actor (Tarja-Tuulikki Tarsala) and Best Sound Design (Kyösti Väntänen).

Cast 
 Jorma Tommila as Ali
 Tommi Eronen as Pulu, Ali's brother
 Maria Järvenhelmi as Inka, Ali's girlfriend
 Ilkka Koivula as Alpi
 Kari Väänänen as Heinonen
 Elmeri Karlsson as Ville, Ali and Inka's son
 Rauno Juvonen as Naama
 Arttu Kapulainen as Vilkku
 Peter Franzén as Reino
 Petri Manninen as Mulko

References

External links 
 
 

2000 crime drama films
2000 films
Films directed by Olli Saarela
Films set in Helsinki
Films shot in Finland
Films scored by Tuomas Kantelinen
Finnish crime drama films